Angkalanthus is a genus of plant in the family Acanthaceae.  It contains the following species (but this list may be incomplete):
 Angkalanthus oligophylla Balf.f.

Acanthaceae
Acanthaceae genera
Taxonomy articles created by Polbot
Taxa named by Isaac Bayley Balfour